Uwe Reinders (born 19 January 1955) is a German former footballer and manager.

Playing career
A former forward, Reinders played 206 times and scored 67 goals for Werder Bremen in the Bundesliga between 1977–1985. Abroad he played for Girondins de Bordeaux (1985–1986) and Stade Rennais (1986–1987). He appeared four times for West Germany, his most prominent participation was the one in the 1982 World Cup finals, where he scored the fourth goal in West Germany 4–1 win over Chile in the first round. His only goal in his short national team career. In 1987, Reinders became player manager at Eintracht Braunschweig.

Coaching career
After retiring from playing, he continued his managerial career at then 2. Bundesliga side Eintracht Braunschweig in 1988–1989. After two seasons as manager with Braunschweig he departed from the club, taking over Hansa Rostock in East Germany's NOFV Oberliga Nordost, previously known as DDR-Oberliga. As East Germany's Deutscher Fußball-Verband was to finally merge into Deutscher Fußball Bund after that, the 1990–91 season worked out to be the factor for those former DDR-Oberliga clubs to enqueue into the German football league structure. Under Reinders guidance Rostock won the final edition of the East German Cup (against FC Stahl Eisenhüttenstadt) and also grabbed the NOFV Oberliga Nordost title, which meant the team qualified to start in the Bundesliga in the 1991–92 season. Enjoying a fantastic start to the 1991–92 season, Rostock's form slumped massively and, with the threat of relegation rising, let the club sack him on 6 March 1992.

Just a month later he was back in charge of a Bundesliga outfit, successing Willibert Kremer at fellow relegation threatened MSV Duisburg. Reinders failed to avoid relegation with them. The begin of the then next season saw Reinders keep on at MSV, but on 21 October 1993, he left the Ruhr club to take charge of fellow 2. Bundesliga side Hertha BSC. A job in which he lasted only five months before the faced the sack. It took nearly eight years to enable him a return to management in the top division of German football. On 25 October 2002, Eintracht Braunschweig of 2. Bundesliga re-appointed Reinders as manager, he succeeded Peter Vollmann at the just re-promoted club. However, he could not keep Braunschweig up and was, following an uninspiring run through the lower Regionalliga Nord, sacked by them on 2 March 2004.

Reinders' next jobs were 1. FC Pforzheim, and then Brinkumer SV, a club promoted to the fourth tier of German football, Oberliga Nord, at the start of the 2005–06 season. Yet, he was not for long their manager, he resigned from his role mid-way through their campaign at a time when the club was only second from bottom with just seven points in the bank.

Honours

Player
Werder Bremen
 Bundesliga runners-up: 1982–83, 1984–85

Bordeaux
 Coupe de France: 1986

West Germany
 FIFA World Cup finalist: 1982

References

External links

 
 
 

1955 births
Living people
Footballers from Essen
Association football forwards
German footballers
Germany international footballers
Germany B international footballers
Germany under-21 international footballers
West German expatriate footballers
West German footballers
SV Werder Bremen players
FC Girondins de Bordeaux players
Stade Rennais F.C. players
Eintracht Braunschweig players
Expatriate footballers in France
West German expatriate sportspeople in France
Eintracht Braunschweig managers
FC Hansa Rostock managers
Hertha BSC managers
MSV Duisburg managers
1982 FIFA World Cup players
Bundesliga players
2. Bundesliga players
Ligue 1 players
Bundesliga managers
2. Bundesliga managers
German football managers